Bucculatrix hagnopis is a moth in the family Bucculatricidae. It is found in India. The species was first described in 1930 by Edward Meyrick.

References

Natural History Museum Lepidoptera generic names catalog

Bucculatricidae
Moths described in 1930
Taxa named by Edward Meyrick
Moths of Asia